Harold Charles Ave (March 29, 1900 – August 9, 1986) was an American football and basketball coach.  He served as the head football coach at Eureka College in 1938, at Eastern Illinois State Teachers College—now known as Eastern Illinois University—from 1939 to 1942, and at Western Illinois University in 1948, compiling a career college football record of 15–28–2.  Ave was also the head basketball coach at Eureka from 1939 to 1942, tallying a mark of 35–25.

Ave played college football at Baldwin-Wallace College—now known as Baldwin Wallace University—and the Carnegie Institute of Technology—now known as Carnegie Mellon University.  He was the athletic director and head coach at Willoughby High School in Willoughby, Ohio before he was hired at Eastern Illinois.

Head coaching record

Football

References

External links
 

1900 births
1986 deaths
American football guards
Baldwin Wallace Yellow Jackets football players
Basketball coaches from Ohio
Carnegie Mellon Tartans football players
Eastern Illinois Panthers football coaches
Eureka Red Devils athletic directors
Eureka Red Devils football coaches
Eureka Red Devils men's basketball coaches
Western Illinois Leathernecks football coaches
High school football coaches in Ohio
Players of American football from Cleveland